Emil Telmányi (22 June 1892 – 13 June 1988) was a Hungarian violinist.

Telmányi was born in Arad, Partium, Transylvania, then in the Kingdom of Hungary.

In 1911 he gave the Berlin premiere of the Violin Concerto of Sir Edward Elgar. It was attended by the pianist Ignaz Friedman, who befriended him and arranged some of his early concerts in Copenhagen, where he later settled. He became an exponent of the composer Carl Nielsen, having recorded some of his violin sonatas and his violin concerto; he was also married to Nielsen's daughter, Anne Marie, from 1918 to 1933.

One of his most famous recordings is a 1954 recording of Bach's Sonatas and partitas for solo violin played using a violin with what was referred to as the "Vega" Bach Bow (recorded in November 1953 and March 1954, DANA CORD, DACO 147), which could be adjusted so the player could play three or even all four strings of the violin at once. He died, aged 95, in Holte, Denmark.

References

 recordings of Emil Telmányi playing works by Carl Nielsen
 discussion of the Vega bow from the Global Bach community

Hungarian classical violinists
Male classical violinists
Hungarian music educators
20th-century classical violinists
20th-century Hungarian male musicians
1892 births
1988 deaths
Hungarian emigrants to Denmark